
Xiangyang is a prefecture-level city in Hubei, China.

Xiangyang may refer to:
Xiangyang Mountain, a  mountain in the Central Mountain Range of Taiwan

Districts
Xiangyang District, Hegang, Heilongjiang
Xiangyang District, Jiamusi, Heilongjiang

Subdistricts
Xiangyang Subdistrict, Fuyang, in Yingdong District, Fuyang, Anhui
Xiangyang Subdistrict, Xuancheng, in Xuanzhou District, Xuancheng, Anhui
Xiangyang Subdistrict, Beijing, in Fangshan District, Beijing
Xiangyang Subdistrict, Qinzhou, in Qinnan District, Qinzhou, Guangxi
Xiangyang Subdistrict, Jixi, in Jiguan District, Jixi, Heilongjiang
Xiangyang Subdistrict, Mudanjiang, in Aimin District, Mudanjiang, Heilongjiang
Xiangyang Subdistrict, Chifeng, in Songshan District, Chifeng, Inner Mongolia
Xiangyang Subdistrict, Zhalantun, Inner Mongolia
Xiangyang Subdistrict, Jiujiang, in Xunyang District, Jiujiang, Jiangxi
Xiangyang Subdistrict, Jilin City, in Chuanying District, Jilin City, Jilin
Xiangyang Subdistrict, Taonan, Jilin
Xiangyang Subdistrict, Chaoyang, in Longcheng District, Chaoyang, Liaoning
Xiangyang Subdistrict, Tieling, in Qinghe District, Tieling, Liaoning
Xiangyang Subdistrict, Weinan, in Linwei District, Weinan, Shaanxi
Xiangyang Subdistrict, Yantai, in Zhifu District, Yantai, Shandong
Xiangyang Subdistrict, Shihezi, Xinjiang

Towns
Xiangyang, Tian'e County, Guangxi
Xiangyang, Jidong County, Heilongjiang
Xiangyang, Tongjiang, Heilongjiang
Xiangyang, Wuchang, Heilongjiang
Xiangyang, Xiangfang District, Harbin, Heilongjiang
Xiangyang, Liuhe County, Jilin
Xiangyang, Ziyang County, Shaanxi
Xiangyang, Shanxi, in Jiancaoping District, Taiyuan, Shanxi
Xiangyang, Guanghan, Sichuan

Townships
Xiangyang Township, Anhui, in Lingbi County, Anhui
Xiangyang Township, Fujian, in Nan'an, Fujian
Xiangyang Township, Jiayin County, Heilongjiang
Xiangyang Township, Zhaodong, in Zhaodong,  Heilongjiang
Xiangyang Township, Liaoning, in Huanren Manchu Autonomous County, Liaoning
Xiangyang Township, Sichuan, in Puge County, Sichuan
Xiangyang Township, Yunnan, in Luxi County, Yunnan